The Headless Horseman Hayrides and Haunted Houses (or H5) is an outdoor haunted attraction in the Hudson Valley area of New York.

Background
Michael and Nancy Jubie opened the hayride for the Halloween season in 1992, stemming from a disguise business Michael Jubie developed during his time as an undercover police officer, and inspired by the couple's love of Halloween. As of 2015, it featured twelve distinct attractions and employed over 350 people during the season.

Attractions

Hayride
The hayride takes place on a wagon which holds 25–30 people, and is facilitated by a "storyteller," an actor who is on the wagon for the ride. Each year the hayride has a different theme, and the storyteller narrates a tale and interacts with other characters.

Corn maze
Numerous actors are hidden in a one-way maze to scare passersby.

Haunted houses
Several haunted houses, each updated annually with a new theme, are also part of the attraction.

The Creature
Appearing in 2007, the Creature was a -long inflated attraction that appeared to be a sleeping dinosaur or dragon. Customers passed through the mouth and walked past internal organs on their way through to the back.

Other activities
H5 includes four eating establishments (Croaked Crow Cafe, Evil Eatery, Witch Hazel's and Deadly Doughnut) and four gift shops (Magic Moon Gifts, Ghoulish Gifts, Phantom Photos, and Scarewear).

Charity benefits
2013 & 2014: Hosted Bark-for-Life event to raise money for cancer. 
2008: Profits from opening night were donated to the Children's Annex, an autism services provider in the Hudson Valley.
2007: A behind-the-scenes look at the hayride was used to raise money for The Queen's Galley, a Kingston, New York-based food bank.

Frosty Fest
In 2007 the owners relaunched Frosty Fest, a Christmas-themed event that had originally been conceived and attempted early in the attraction's run.

References

External links
 The Headless Horseman Hayride and Haunted Houses

Halloween events in the United States
Haunted attractions (simulated)
Animatronic attractions
Amusement rides introduced in 1992